Ti Thong Road is one of the roads in inner Bangkok or Rattanakosin Island. It's located in Phra Nakhon district, the short road is only  linking Bamrung Mueang road beside to Wat Suthat and the corner of Giant Swing plaza to Charoen Krung road in front of Sala Chalermkrung Royal Theatre area, including  connects to Fueang Nakhon road by Ratchabophit road at the side of Wat Ratchabophit. It's a road that was built since the reign of King Mongkut (Rama IV).

The name of the road means "goldsmith road". It's the place where the Lao community migrated from Vientiane and Luang Prabang since early Rattanakosin period. These people have a career in gold leaf production. At present, this career no longer exists. But still appear evidence is an alley on the west side named "Trok Fueang Thong" (ตรอกเฟื่องทอง; lit: prosperous gold lane).

Presently, Ti Thong road is well-known as home of uniforms and trappings of Thai official shops, especially military and police officers, including also trophy shops.

Transportation
BMTA bus: route 12, 42

References

External links

Phra Nakhon district
Streets in Bangkok